Dhungel is a surname found in Nepal. Dhungel is a variant of Brahmin. Dhungels are usually found in Nepal. Notable peoples with surname Dhungel include:
Surya Prasad Dhungel (Upadhyay) 1st Democratic Home Minister of Nepal in B.S 2007.
Sarada Prasad Dhungel (Upadhyay) 1st and founding Rector of Tribhuvan University. Nepalese Educationalist.
Dwarika Nath Dhungel, Nepalese political activist, social scientist and administrator.
Dr. Dhruba Prasad Dhungel, Educator and TEVT policy expert
Rameshwor Prasad Dhungel, Nepalese politician and Member of Legislative Assembly of Nepal
Ram Hari Dhungel, Nepalese politician
Nagendra Prasad Dhungel, Nepalese Politician and former Member of Nepali Congress Party. One of the revolutionary leaders, who worked alongside BP Koirala against the then “Panchayat Regime” of Nepal.
Uttam Raj Dhungel, Business Tycoon and Social Activist.
.

Individuals with this surname also live in the United States, Australia and other countries as individuals have moved around the globe for academic and professional reasons. In Kathmandu, many live in Katunje, Bhaktapur. 

Nepali-language surnames
Khas surnames
Surnames of Nepalese origin